Terence Lucy Greenidge (14 January 1902 – 18 December 1970) was an English writer and actor. Greenidge was a friend of Evelyn Waugh, whom he met at Oxford, and collaborated with him in producing the Scarlet Woman: An Ecclesiastical Melodrama. Evelyn Waugh in Letters (editor by Charles E. Linck) was published posthumously in 1994, which details many of Greenidge's recollections of Evelyn Waugh.

Early life
Greenidge was the second son of Abel Hendy Jones Greenidge (who came up to study and remained at Oxford as an academic), of a family resident on Barbados since 1635, and his wife Edith Elizabeth, the youngest daughter of William Lucy, at that time the sole owner of Lucy Ironworks, previously known as the Eagle Ironworks, in Walton Well Road, Jericho, Oxford. Terence Greenidge's parents died within a year of each other in 1906/07 and the young Terence was brought up by his guardian/godfather, Dr Rev. Henry Herbert Williams, who went on to become Bishop of Carlisle between 1920 and 1947. 

Terence went to Dragon School in Oxford, before going up to Rugby School between 1915 and 1920. He won a scholarship to Hertford College, Oxford where he read Classics and obtained a second in Honours Moderns and a second in Greats.  The Trustee of his father’s will was the bursar at Hertford. At Oxford, he was one of the founding members of the Hypocrites' Club and kept friends with Evelyn and Alec Waugh and introducing them to the club.

In the summer of 1924, Terence Greenidge, his brother John Greenidge, Evelyn Waugh, and John Sutro, the film producer whom Terence knew at Rugby School, contributed £5 each to purchase a cine-camera and started filming the Scarlet Woman: An Ecclesiastical Melodrama, a collaboration that would only yield a small dividend, some forty-two years later, to John Sutro and Terence Greenidge, since by then his brother John Greenidge (October 1953) and Evelyn Waugh (April 1966) had died.

Written works

Brass and Paint, together with The Magnificent, were among several books published by the Fortune Press to be seized by the police in 1934 and successfully prosecuted for obscene libel.

Acting career
As well as being a playwright, Greenidge was an actor although he only played smaller roles on stage and television.  He was still acting at the Royal Shakespeare Theatre at Stratford-on-Avon until three years before his death in 1970.

Filmography

References

External links
Full version and direction of "Scarlet Woman" see Evelyn Waugh Newsletter Vol3 No2 Autumn 1969 
Biography 

1902 births
1970 deaths
People educated at The Dragon School
People educated at Rugby School
Alumni of Hertford College, Oxford
English writers
20th-century English male actors
English male stage actors
English male television actors